Ron Finley Stadium (also known as Citizens Bank Field) is a football stadium in Campbellsville, Kentucky, United States. It is the home stadium for the Campbellsville University Tigers football and soccer teams. The athletic department completed renovations in 2010, which included a new lighting system and artificial FieldTurf playing surface.The stadium was dedicated in 2006 in honor of Ron Finley, who helped reinstate the football program in 1987 and served as head coach until 2002.

References

Campbellsville Tigers football
College football venues
American football venues in Kentucky
Buildings and structures in Taylor County, Kentucky
Campbellsville, Kentucky